Kulem railway station (station code: QLM) is a main railway station in South Goa district, Goa. It serves Kulem village. The station consists of three platforms. The platforms are not well sheltered. It lacks many facilities including water and sanitation.

Regular shuttle trains run between Vasco. It is the Passenger Train between Vasco and Kulem via Margao and  stops at Kulem to attach banker locomotives before the train starts journey up the Dudhsagar Falls to reach Castle Rock. The falls are a popular destination.

Trains 

 Vasco da Gama–Kulem Passenger
 Vasco–Chennai Express
 Poorna Express
 Yesvantpur–Vasco da Gama Express
 Amaravati Express
 Vasco da Gama–Kacheguda Amaravati Express
 Hubballi–Vasco da Gama Goa Link Express
 Kacheguda–Vasco da Gama Express
 Tirupati–Vasco da Gama Express
 Hyderabad–Vasco da Gama Express
 Goa Express

Vasco da Gama - Velankanni Weekly Express
Vasco da Gama Jasidih Weekly Express
Kulem- Vasco da Gama Demu Special ↔️
Vasco da Gama Yesvantpur Express

References

Hubli railway division
Railway stations in South Goa district